Alvarado Estates is a neighborhood in the College area of San Diego, California.  It is a gated community of over 100 homes on lots of one acre or more, with limited access streets, and has a community park. Neighborliness is fostered by the Alvarado Community Association, which is governed by a volunteer Board of Directors.

See also
 Communities of San Diego

References

Neighborhoods in San Diego